Madeleine Plamondon (born September 21, 1931) is a Canadian retired Senator and consumer advocate specializing in financial services, privacy, and rights of the elderly.

She has headed the Service d'aide au consommateur in Shawinigan, Quebec since its foundation in 1974 and has also been active with  the Financial Services OmbudsNetwork, the Bureau des services financiers (Quebec) and the Association des courtiers et agents immobiliers du Québec.

In September 2003, Plamondon was appointed to the Senate by Prime Minister Jean Chrétien who is a fellow resident of Shawinigan. She sits as an independent Senator. She retired from the Upper House on September 21, 2006 when she attained the mandatory retirement age of 75.

External links
 

1931 births
Living people
Canadian senators from Quebec
Independent Canadian senators
People from Centre-du-Québec
Women members of the Senate of Canada
Women in Quebec politics
21st-century Canadian politicians
21st-century Canadian women politicians